Mosty  is a village in the administrative district of Gmina Chęciny, within Kielce County, Świętokrzyskie Voivodeship, in south-central Poland.

The village has a population of 130.

Mosty's underdevelopment is caused partially by the fact that for many years the area was planned to be flooded and become Morze Chęcińskie (Chęciny Sea), an artificial lake that would cover the village and its surroundings. The idea emerged in 1930s and, if successful, it would have been the biggest artificial lake (reservoir) in Europe. Due to this project, only in 2005 proved unprofitable and aborted, there was no investment in the area. Until today, many houses still do not have running water and the village was connected to the electricity line in 1970s.

References

2. Baran, P. (2014, June 31). Wieś Mosty w Gminie Chęciny zmieni swojr oblicze.Echo Dnia. Retrieved from http://www.echodnia.eu/swietokrzyskie/wiadomosci/powiat-kielecki/art/8068106,wies-mosty-w-gminie-checiny-zmieni-swoje-oblicze,id,t.html

Villages in Kielce County